The Burkina Faso national under-20 football team is the under-20 youth team for national football in Burkina Faso. The team is controlled by the Burkinabé Football Federation.

The team participated at the 2003 FIFA World Youth Championship held in the United Arab Emirates. They did very well in the group stage and finished first. In the round of 16 they were eliminated by Canada 1–0. That tournament was their first ever U-20 World Cup.

The team won the gold medal in the men's tournament at the 2019 African Games held in Morocco. This was the first time the team won gold at the African Games. Djibril Ouattara was among the top scorers in the tournament.

Current squad
The following players were selected for the 2021 Africa U-20 Cup of Nations.

References 

African national under-20 association football teams
under-20